Black Point is one of the districts of the Bahamas. As of 2010, it has a population of 414 and an area of 12.1 km2.

References

Districts of the Bahamas